Grevillea petrophiloides, commonly known as pink pokers, rock grevillea or poker grevillea, is a species of flowering plant in the family Proteaceae and is endemic to the south-west of Western Australia. It is an erect shrub with divided leaves, the lobes mostly linear, and cylindrical clusters of usually pink to reddish pink and bluish-grey flowers.

Description

Taxonomy
Grevillea petrophiloides was first formally described in 1848 by Carl Meissner in Johann Georg Christian Lehmann's Plantae Preissianae based on plant material collected by James Drummond in the Swan River Colony. The specific epithet (petrophiloides) means "Petrophile-like".
In 1986, Donald McGillivray described three subspecies of G. petrophiloides in his book New Names in Grevillea (Proteaceae), two of which have been accepted by the Australian Plant Census, and in 2000, Robert Owen Makinson changed to name of Grevillea magnifica subsp. remota Olde & Marriott to G. petrophiloides subsp. remota in the Flora of Australia:

Distribution and habitat
Subspecies magnifica grows on or near granite outcrops mainly between Tammin and Pantapin in the Avon Wheatbelt and Mallee bioregions, subspecies petrophiloides in shrubland or heath on sandplains between the lower Murchison River, Quairading and Hyden in the Avon Wheatbelt, Geraldton Sandplains and Mallee bioregions and subspecies remota grows on or near granite outcrops from near Varley to Norseman in the Avon Wheatbelt, Coolgardie and Mallee bioregions of south-western Western Australia.

Conservation status
Subspecies magnifica and petrophiloides are listed as "not threatened" but subspecies remota is classified as "Priority Three" by the Government of Western Australia Department of Biodiversity, Conservation and Attractions, meaning that it is poorly known and known from only a few locations but is not under imminent threat.

References

petrophiloides
Endemic flora of Western Australia
Eudicots of Western Australia
Proteales of Australia
Taxa named by Carl Meissner
Plants described in 1848